Euschoengastia setosa is a mite in the genus Euschoengastia of the family Trombiculidae that mostly parasitizes small rodents and lagomorphs. Recorded hosts include marsh rice rat (Oryzomys palustris) in Georgia; the deermouse (Peromyscus maniculatus) in Tennessee; and the eastern red squirrel (Tamiasciurus hudsonicus) in North Carolina, among others.

See also 
 List of parasites of the marsh rice rat

References

Literature cited 
Reeves, W.K., Durden, L.A., Ritzi, C.M., Beckham, K.R., Super, P.E. and O'Connor, B.M. 2007. Ectoparasites and other ectosymbiotic arthropods of vertebrates in the Great Smoky Mountains National Park, USA (abstract only). Zootaxa 1392:31–68.
Wilson, N. and Durden, L.A. 2003. Ectoparasites of terrestrial vertebrates inhabiting the Georgia Barrier Islands, USA: an inventory and preliminary biogeographical analysis (subscription required). Journal of Biogeography 30(8):1207–1220.

Trombidiformes
Animals described in 1937
Parasites of rodents
Arachnids of North America